In mathematics, the FEE method, or fast E-function evaluation method, is the method of fast summation of series of a special form.

A class of functions, which are "similar to the exponential function," was given the name "E-functions" by Carl Ludwig Siegel. Among these functions are such special functions as the hypergeometric function, cylinder, spherical functions and so on.

Using the FEE, it is possible to prove the following theorem:

Theorem: Let  be an elementary transcendental function, that is the exponential function, or a 
trigonometric function, or an elementary algebraic function, or their superposition, or their inverse, or a superposition of the inverses. Then

Here  is the complexity of computation (bit) of the function  with accuracy up to  digits,  is the complexity of multiplication of two -digit integers.

The algorithms based on the method FEE include the algorithms for fast calculation of any elementary transcendental function for any value of the argument, the classical constants e,   the Euler constant  the Catalan and the Apéry constants, such higher transcendental functions as the Euler gamma function and its derivatives, the hypergeometric, spherical, cylinder (including the Bessel) functions and some other functions for
algebraic values of the argument and parameters, the Riemann zeta function for integer values of the argument and the Hurwitz zeta function for integer argument and algebraic values of the parameter, and also such special integrals as the integral of probability, the Fresnel integrals, the integral exponential function, the trigonometric integrals, and some other integrals for algebraic values of the argument with the complexity bound which is close to the optimal one, namely

At present, only the FEE makes it possible to calculate fast the values of the functions from the class of higher transcendental functions, certain special integrals of mathematical physics and such classical constants as Euler's, Catalan's and Apéry's constants. An additional advantage of the method FEE is the possibility of parallelizing the algorithms based on the FEE.

FEE computation of classical constants 

For fast evaluation of the
constant  one can use the Euler formula

and apply the FEE to sum the Taylor series for

with the remainder terms    which satisfy the bounds

and for

To calculate   by the
FEE it is possible to use also other approximations In all cases the complexity is

To compute the Euler constant gamma with accuracy up to 
digits, it is necessary to sum by the FEE two series. Namely, for

The complexity is

To evaluate fast the constant  
it is possible to apply the
FEE to other approximations.

FEE computation of certain power series 

By the FEE the two following series are calculated fast:

under the assumption that  are
integers,

The complexity of the evaluation of the series is

FEE calculation of the classical constant e 

For the evaluation of the constant  take , terms of the Taylor series for 

Here we choose , requiring that for the remainder  the
inequality  is fulfilled. This is the case, for
example, when  Thus, we take 
such that the natural number  is determined by the
inequalities:

We calculate the sum

in  steps of the following process.

Step 1. Combining in  the summands sequentially in pairs we
carry out of the brackets the "obvious" common factor and obtain

We shall compute only integer values of the expressions in the
parentheses, that is the values

Thus, at the first step the sum  is into

At the first step  integers of the form

are calculated. After that we act in a similar way: combining on
each step the summands of the sum  sequentially in pairs, we
take out of the brackets the 'obvious' common factor and compute
only the integer values of the expressions in the brackets. Assume
that the first  steps of this process are completed.

Step .

we compute only  integers of the form

Here

is the product of  integers.

Etc.

Step , the last one. We compute one integer value
 we compute, using the fast algorithm described
above the value  and make one division of the integer
 by the integer  
with accuracy up to 
digits. The obtained result is the sum  or the constant  up
to  digits. The complexity of all computations is

See also
Fast algorithms
AGM method
Computational complexity

References

External links
 http://www.ccas.ru/personal/karatsuba/divcen.htm
 http://www.ccas.ru/personal/karatsuba/algen.htm

Numerical analysis
Computer arithmetic algorithms
Pi algorithms